Paul H. Durham (October 18, 1913 – June 22, 2007) was an American football and basketball coach and college athletic administrator. He served as the head football coach at Linfield College in McMinnville, Oregon from 1948 to 1967, compiling a record of 121–51–10 . During his tenure, he began a string of consecutive winning seasons at Linfield that continues to this day. Durham was also Linfield's head men's basketball coach from 1949 to 1952, tallying a mark of 31–48. He concluded his career as the athletic director at the University of Hawaii at Manoa.

Head coaching record

College football

References

1913 births
2007 deaths
American men's basketball players
Hawaii Rainbow Warriors and Rainbow Wahine athletic directors
Linfield Wildcats football coaches
Linfield Wildcats football players
Linfield Wildcats men's basketball coaches
Linfield Wildcats men's basketball players
College men's track and field athletes in the United States
High school football coaches in Oregon